Ruby Roseman-Gannon (born 8 November 1998) is an Australian professional cyclist riding for UCI Women's WorldTeam . She won the Australian National Criterium Championship in 2022. She was the overall winner of Australia's National Road Series in 2021.

Major results
2021
 1st Overall National Road Series
2022
 National Road Championships
 1st  Criterium
 3rd Road race

References

External links
Ruby Roseman-Gannon at ProCyclingStats

Australian female cyclists
Living people
1998 births
20th-century Australian women
21st-century Australian women